Le Mesnil-en-Vallée is a former commune in the Maine-et-Loire department in western France. On 15 December 2015, it was merged into the new commune Mauges-sur-Loire.

See also
Communes of the Maine-et-Loire department

References

Mesnilenvallee